Phillip James Holiday (born 23 May 1970) is a South African former professional boxer who competed from 1991 to 2010. He won the IBF lightweight title in 1995, making six successful defences until suffering the first defeat of his career against Shane Mosley.

See also 
 List of IBF world champions

References

External links 
 

1970 births
International Boxing Federation champions
Living people
Welterweight boxers
Australian male boxers